Gamma-parvin is a protein that in humans is encoded by the PARVG gene.

Members of the parvin family, including PARVG, PARVA and PARVB, are actin-binding proteins associated with focal contacts.[supplied by OMIM]

References

Further reading